William Glover Young (born September 23, 1940) is a Senior United States district judge of the United States District Court for the District of Massachusetts.

Education and career
Born in Huntington, New York, Young received an Artium Baccalaureus degree from Harvard University in 1962. He received a Bachelor of Laws from Harvard Law School in 1967. He was a Captain in the United States Army from 1962 to 1964. He was a law clerk for Chief Justice Raymond S. Wilkins of the Massachusetts Supreme Judicial Court from 1967 to 1968. He was in private practice of law in Boston, Massachusetts from 1968 to 1972. Young was a special assistant attorney general of Massachusetts from 1970 to 1972 and chief counsel to the Governor of Massachusetts, Republican Francis Sargent, from 1972 to 1974. He was in private practice of law in Boston from 1975 to 1978. He was an associate justice of the Superior Court of Massachusetts from 1978 to 1985. Young was a lecturer in law for Boston College Law School from 1968 to the present and at Boston University Law School from 1979 to the present. He was a lecturer in law at Harvard Law School from 1979 to 1990.

Federal judicial service
Young was first nominated by President Ronald Reagan on September 11, 1984 to the United States District Court for the District of Massachusetts, to a new seat created by 98 Stat. 333, but the nomination lapsed without a Senate vote. Reagan renominated him on March 8, 1985. He was confirmed by the United States Senate on April 3, 1985, and received his commission on April 4, 1985. He served as Chief Judge from 1999 to 2005. On March 10, 2021, Young has advised President Joe Biden that he intended to retire from regular active service on July 1, 2021, and that he will serve as a senior judge thereafter.

Notable cases

Patent cases 
Young has worked on federal judge on patent cases relating to biotechnology and pharmaceuticals., and also heard computer-related patent cases, including a patent infringement suit by a small company against RealNetworks. The jury found that the patents were invalid and the case was affirmed upon appeal.

Criminal cases 
Young has heard many criminal cases both as a Massachusetts state judge and as a federal judge, including the "Big Dan" rape case, the shoe bomber case, and the Boston Strangler case.

He  was the trial judge in Massachusetts state court for the highly publicized 'Big Dan' rape case which was the inspiration for the movie The Accused starring Jodie Foster. He sentenced Richard Reid, better known as the shoe bomber, to 3 life terms plus 110 years in prison.

Constitutional law cases 
Young heard Singer v. City of Newton, the first case in the United States on the constitutionality of state and local regulation of drones (unmanned aerial vehicles). Judge Young partially invalidated the city ordinance because it was preempted by Federal Aviation Administration regulations.

References

Sources
 

1940 births
Living people
Harvard Law School alumni
Massachusetts state court judges
Judges of the United States District Court for the District of Massachusetts
United States district court judges appointed by Ronald Reagan
20th-century American judges
People from Huntington, New York
Boston College faculty
Boston University School of Law faculty
Harvard Law School faculty
Massachusetts lawyers
20th-century American lawyers
21st-century American judges
Harvard College alumni